Casimir or Kasimir III (IV) (1348 – 24 August 1372), oldest son of Barnim III, was one of the Dukes of Pomerania-Stettin (Szczecin). He died during a campaign against the Margraviate of Brandenburg during the siege of Königsberg (Neumark) in 1372.

See also
List of Pomeranian duchies and dukes
History of Pomerania
Duchy of Pomerania
House of Pomerania

Ancestors

References

1348 births
1372 deaths
Dukes of Pomerania
People from Szczecin